Jay Cantor (born 1948 New York City) is an American novelist and essayist.

He graduated from Harvard University with a BA, and from University of California, Santa Cruz with a Ph.D.
He teaches at Tufts University.
He lives in Cambridge, Massachusetts, with his wife, Melinda Marble, and their daughter, Grace.

His work appeared in The Harvard Crimson.
He was on the 2009 ArtScience Competition jury.

Awards
1989 MacArthur Fellows Program

Works

Novels
 The Death of Che Guevara, Knopf, 1983, 
 Krazy Kat: a novel in five panels, Knopf, 1988, 
Great Neck: a novel, Knopf, 2003, 
 Forgiving the Angel: Four Stories for Franz Kafka, Knopf, 2014,

Essays
 The Space Between: Literature and Politics, Johns Hopkins University Press, 1982, 
 On Giving Birth to One's Own Mother. Knopf, 1991,

References

External links
"Jay Cantor talks about food", Cantabrigia
"An Interview with Jay Cantor", Ken Capobianco and Jay Cantor, Journal of Modern Literature, Vol. 17, No. 1 (Summer, 1990), pp. 3–11
"Jay Cantor. Great Neck. (Book Review)", The Review of Contemporary Fiction, June 22, 2003, James Crossley

1948 births
Writers from New York City
20th-century American novelists
Harvard University alumni
University of California, Santa Cruz alumni
Tufts University faculty
MacArthur Fellows
Living people
21st-century American novelists
American male novelists
American male essayists
20th-century American essayists
21st-century American essayists
20th-century American male writers
21st-century American male writers
Novelists from New York (state)
Novelists from Massachusetts